Jegath Gaspar Raj is a Chennai-based Catholic priest. He is the founder of the Tamil Maiyam organisation and co creator of the Chennai Sangamam festival. During 1995–2001 he served as the director of the Tamil service for Radio Veritas.  He is also the organiser of the Idea-GiveLife Chennai International Marathon. He is also the founder of the Naller publications, a book publishing company. In 2009, during the final stages of Eelam War IV, he functioned as an intermediary between the Liberation Tigers of Tamil Eelam and the Government of Tamil Nadu.

He also founded an organisation for business personalities of Tamil as a mother tongue.  This is called (Confedaration of Tamil Agriculture, Commerce, Industry and Services - CTACIS) In Tamil THAMIZHAR THOZHIL VARTHGA VIVACYA PERUMANDRAM. All the members meet once in a week to discuss and improve their respective businesses.

References

People from Kanyakumari district
People from Tamil Nadu
Living people
1966 births
20th-century Indian Roman Catholic priests
21st-century Indian Roman Catholic priests